2003 Tuzla Island conflict is a crisis in Russia–Ukraine relations at the end of 2003 caused by disputes over the ownership of Tuzla Island and the construction by Russia of a dam in the Kerch Strait to Tuzla Island. The dispute raised fears of an armed confrontation.

Background 
Tuzla Island is a sandy island, located off of the coast of the Crimean Peninsula. Formerly a strait connected by land to the Kuban region of Russia, it was disconnected from it by heavy storm in 1925. In 1941, the island was transferred to the Crimean A.S.S.R. In 1954, Tuzla Island was transferred to the Ukrainian S.S.R., alongside the rest of the then-Crimean Oblast. Tuzla Island come under the control of the briefly-independent Republic of Crimea before joining with Ukraine when the Crimean parliament joined Ukraine in 1995.

The island was home to a dozen families of Ukrainian fishermen, in addition to a number of hotels.

Russia recognized Ukrainian sovereignty over Crimea in 1997, but the status of Tuzla Island was not settled and remained a sorespot in Russia-Ukraine relations. The governor of Krasnodar Krai at the time, Alexksandr Tkachyov, stated "...I think that this is land that was bathed in Cossack blood, and therefore it is our sacred land", claiming the peninsula as part of Russia. Tkachyov had later met with the deputy speaker of the Russian duma, Vladimir Zhirinovsky, with Zhirinovsky claiming that the majority of the Duma backed the Russian claim over Tuzla island.

Controlling the island would give either country much control over the shipping to the Sea of Azov, and for that reason was seen as a priority for the Ukrainian government.

Events
On September 9, 2003, Russian authorities began construction on a dam from the Taman Peninsula towards Tuzla island, with a number of Kuban Cossack activists following the construction workers. It is still disputed what entity in Russia began the construction, with one version of events claiming that local Kuban Cossacks began construction to manage salt water flow to Taman Bay due to issues with breeding fish and erosion. Kyiv newspaper "Zerkalo nedeli" disputed this claim, instead claiming that it was an attempt by a number of local businessmen and Ukrainian politician Leonid Hrach to convince Ukraine and Russia to build a bridge over the Kerch strait. Ukraine has accused Russia of attempting to annex the island, if completed the dam connection would have transformed Tuzla from a Ukrainian island into the tip of Russian mainland, and gave Russia control over the strait's navigable channel. Russia has dismissed the claim, saying it is merely trying to fight the effects of erosion on the Taman peninsula. Ukraine responded by stationing troops on Tuzla Island.

The Ukrainian government responded by deploying additional border guards on the island, with then-Prime Minister Viktor Yanukovych stating “Tuzla is an integral part of Ukrainian territory". Deputy Prime minister Mykola Azarov later stated that the Ukrainian government would spend “whatever amount necessary” to defend its national interest following the allocation of 5.5 million hryvnia to increase border security on Tuzla.

On October 21, 2003, the Border Service of Ukraine arrested the Russian tugboat Truzhenik, claiming that it had crossed the border. On October 23, 2003, the Verkhovna Rada issued a resolution "to eliminate a threat to the territorial integrity of Ukraine that appeared as a result of dam construction by the Russian Federation in the strait of Kerch". A provisional special parliamentary commission was created to investigate the case more thoroughly.

On October 30–31, 2003, talks started between Ukraine and Russia in order to deflate the crisis. President Kuchma ended the confrontation through an undeclared compromise, accepting terms disadvantageous to Ukraine and Russian authorities halted construction of the dam and accepting the continuation of Ukrainian sovereignty over the strait's navigable channel.

Aftermath
The incident would damage Leonid Kuchma's reputation domestically, as he was accused of attempting to control Ukrainian media reporting on the event.

Truzhenik would later be handed back to Russian authorities when tensions cooled.

Following the 2003 conflict, the Supreme Council of Crimea ordered the establishment of a new settlement on the island, but the government of Kerch City refused to allow it.

Disputes about right of passage were resolved by a 2003 bilateral agreement on cooperation in the use of the Sea of Azov and the strait of Kerch, which made these water bodies shared internal waters of both countries.

The island came under full Russian control following the 2014 Russian annexation of Crimea, and part of the Kerch strait bridge would be constructed on it.

See also
 Russia-Ukraine relations
 1986 Black Sea incident
 1988 Black Sea bumping incident
 2018 Kerch Strait incident
 2021 Black Sea incident

References

 
2003 in Russia
2003 in Ukraine
History of Crimea
Prelude to the 2022 Russian invasion of Ukraine
21st-century military history of Russia
2003 in international relations
Conflicts in 2003
Conflicts in Ukraine
Political scandals in Ukraine
Post-Soviet conflicts
Territorial disputes of Russia
Territorial disputes of Ukraine
Russia–Ukraine relations
October 2003 events in Russia
October 2003 events in Ukraine